Sayyid Hamad bin Thuwaini Al-Busaid ( – ) was the fifth Sultan of Zanzibar. He ruled Zanzibar from 5 March 1893 to 25 August 1896.

Life
Sayyid Hamad bin Thuwaini Al-Busaid was born on 1857, probably in Zanzibar.

He was married  to his cousin, Sayyida Turkia bint Turki Al-Said, daughter of Turki bin Said, Sultan of Muscat and Oman. Hamad died suddenly at 11:40 AM on 25 August 1896 and was almost certainly poisoned by his cousin Khalid bin Barghash who proclaimed himself the new Sultan and held the position for three days before being replaced by the British Armed Forces after the Anglo-Zanzibar War.

Foreign honours
: Grand Cross of the Order of the Crown of Italy (1893)
: Knight Grand Commander of the Order of the Star of India (1894)
: Grand Cross of the Order of the Red Eagle, 1st Class (1895)

Citations

1857 births
1896 deaths
Sultans of Zanzibar
Zanzibari royalty
Al Said dynasty
Tanzanian people of Omani descent
19th-century Arabs
19th-century African people
19th-century Omani people